"The Jam Was Moving" is the second single from Debbie Harry's debut solo album, KooKoo. It was released in 1981 with no video and little promotion after Harry's debut solo single, "Backfired", failed to become a big hit.

Background
The single peaked at #82 on the Billboard Pop Singles chart in the US, but made no appearance on any other major chart.

The 7" Mix of "The Jam Was Moving" (featuring additional guitars during the intro) appears on the Chrysalis Records/EMI compilation Most of All - The Best of Deborah Harry. The original 1981 12" mix of "The Jam Was Moving" was also included as a bonus track on Chrysalis Records/EMI UK's 1994 CD re-issue of the KooKoo album, the extended version of the album track "Inner City Spillover" was released by Gold Legion Records in 2011 (the 30th anniversary of the album's release).

In 1988, Debbie Harry and Chris Stein remixed "The Jam Was Moving" for inclusion on the Blondie/Debbie Harry remix compilation Once More into the Bleach.

Track listings

7" vinyl

12" vinyl

Charts

References

External links
 "The Jam Was Moving" lyrics

Debbie Harry songs
1981 singles
Songs written by Bernard Edwards
Songs written by Nile Rodgers
Song recordings produced by Nile Rodgers
Song recordings produced by Bernard Edwards
1981 songs
Chrysalis Records singles